Troy is a former railroad town in Placer County, California. It lay at an elevation of 6345 feet (1934 m).

References

Unincorporated communities in California
Unincorporated communities in Placer County, California